Combe Fishacre is a village in the English county of Devon.

References

External links

Villages in Devon